Yngwin ("Yngve") was, according to Gesta Danorum, a king in Götaland, who was a close friend to one of the Danish kings named Halfdan.

This Danish king had no sons, so he left his treasures and his kingdom to Yngwin. Yngwin then moved to Denmark, and ruled the kingdom for a while, until he was slain by a competitor to the throne, by the name Ragnald.

Yngwin had a son named Siwald, who became king in Denmark after him. Then Siwald's son, Sigar, took the throne after him. Sigar had three sons. One of his sons was Alf, who went aviking. On a raiding tour to Finland, he met Alfhild, the daughter of king Siward, in Götaland. Alfhild had her own fleet of Viking ships, some of them staffed with maidens. Alf and Alfhild later married, and they had a daughter, named Gurid.

In a war fought against a revolting Danish Viking clan, Sigar, Alf and Alf's brothers were killed, while defending their Danish subjects. At the end of the war, Alf's comrade, Borgar, arrived with fresh cavalry from Scania, and slew all the enemies. But without a king, the country fell apart, and chieftains took control of the different parts.

Only Alf's daughter, Gurid, had survived, of the royal family. She later married one of Borgar's sons, Halfdan, and they had a son, named Harald, who became the new king. Harald restored the Danish kingdom to its former glory and unity.

Supposed timeframe
According to the details in the saga, this would have taken place in the 5th century. If true, this would explain much of the warm friendship between Hrothgar, king of Denmark, and Hrethel, king of Götaland, depicted in Beowulf, in the beginning of the next century.

According to Saxo Grammaticus in Gesta Danorum, the aforementioned Harald was the famous Harald Wartooth. But that must be a mistake by Saxo, as that Harald lived several hundred years later.

External links
 The Danish History (Gesta Danorum), English translation

Geats
Kings of the Geats
Mythological kings of Denmark